Charen Fegard is an American politician.

Fegard was born on Howard Air Force Base in Panama. She was one of two members elected to the Vermont House of Representatives Franklin-5 district in 2018, alongside Joshua Aldrich, who resigned without taking his seat. Fegard lost reelection in 2020 to Paul Martin.

References

Living people
Year of birth missing (living people)
People from Berkshire, Vermont
Women state legislators in Vermont
21st-century American women politicians
21st-century American politicians
Democratic Party members of the Vermont House of Representatives